The Chery eQ5 (codeproject S61) is an electric compact crossover SUV by Chery. 

The Chinese name Ant (蚂蚁) is for creating an Ant-themed electric vehicles family within the NEV product series Chery. The company already has an electric city car in the product line called the Little Ant (小蚂蚁) in Chinese or Chery eQ1, and launched the Chery Ant Concept in 2013.

History 

In August 2019, Chery NEV officials mentioned that the firm was developing an all-aluminum platform for pure electric vehicle models and will build electric models by 2020 including the S81, S61, and S57. The three models mentioned would mainly be coupes and SUVs and be capable of equipping electric four-wheel drive system. Additionally, Chery has disclosed that the model built on the all-aluminum pure electric platform will cooperate with tech companies from China, and is expected to provide facial recognition, ADAS, and 5G-V2X. As of December 2019, news of an electric crossover SUV by Chery codenamed the S61 went offline surfaced. The electric S61 debuts a new exterior styling design language and is based on a newly developed all-aluminum pure electric platform. The production version of the S61 model was scheduled to launch in mid 2020. 
Chery unveiled the eQ5 in August 2020, with the electric crossover going on sale at the end of August.

Technical details 
The Chery eQ5 is built on Chery’s new LFS high-strength aluminum-magnesium alloy smart vehicle platform that is only 60 percent the weight of a conventional vehicle’s platform. The LFS high-strength aluminum-magnesium alloy smart vehicle platform has 93 percent of the body frame using aluminium-magnesium alloy, and the weight of the frame of the platform is only  or 60 percent the weight of the structure of vehicles that uses conventional platforms. 

Three rear-wheel-drive variants including the low-output, standard-output, and high-output variants were planned at launch with a single electric motor mounted at the rear.

Interior technologies 

The interior of the Chery eQ5 has a fully digital instrument panel and central infotainment display, with interior features like dual 12.3-inch displays as virtual instrument cluster and touchscreen infotainment system, 220-volt power outlet, Qi fast wireless charger, facial recognition, air quality management system (AQS), CN95-standard air filter, electric-powered seats, black panoramic sunroof, etc. According to Chinese media reports previously, the list of infotainment system features include Artificial intelligence voice recognition system, multi-screen interaction, over-the-air software updates,  Advanced Driver Assistance System and 5G-V2X.

It is said that the Chery eQ5 is the first vehicle in the world to use onboard technologies such as the Huawei’s Harmony OS infotainment system. The eQ5 features include a Level 2 autonomous system assisted by 20 sensors, adaptive cruise control, parking assist, head-on collision prevention, blind zone monitoring, and lane change control.

See also
 List of production battery electric vehicles

References

External links

 

eQ5
Production electric cars
Compact sport utility vehicles
Crossover sport utility vehicles
Cars introduced in 2020
2020s cars